Volva habei is a species of sea snail, a marine gastropod mollusk in the family Ovulidae, the ovulids, cowry allies or false cowries.

Description
The size of the shell varies between 48 mm and 110 mm.

Distribution
This marine species occurs off Taiwan and Japan.

References

 Lorenz F. & Fehse D. (2009) The living Ovulidae. A manual of the families of allied cowries: Ovulidae, Pediculariidae and Eocypraeidae. Hackenheim: Conchbooks. [

Ovulidae
Gastropods described in 1961